Mako may refer to:

Biology
 Mako shark, the genus Isurus, consisting of two living and several fossil species:
 Shortfin mako shark, Isurus oxyrinchus, the more common mako 
 Longfin mako shark, Isurus paucus, the rarer mako
 Aristotelia serrata, a New Zealand tree also known as mako or makomako

Places
 Makó District, Hungary
 Makó, a town and district seat
 Magong or Mako, a Taiwanese city

People
 Mako (actor), stage name of Japanese-American actor Makoto Iwamatsu (1933–2006)
 , Japanese actress
 , Japanese media artist
 , Japanese singer and actress
 , Japanese actress
 , Japanese singer and vocalist
 Mako Kamitsuna, American Film director
 , Japanese volleyball player
 , Japanese author 
 , formerly Princess Mako of the Japanese imperial family
 ,Japanese fashion producer
 , Japanese professional footballer
 , Japanese kickboxer
 , Japanese figure skater
 , Japanese badminton player
 , American novelist
 Mako Vunipola (born 1991), New Zealand-born English rugby player
 Mako Tabuni (1979-2012), was an activist for Papuan interests
 Mako Oliveras (born 1946), is a former Minor League Baseball player
 Mako (DJ), American DJs and electronic dance music producers
 Mako (voice actress) (born 1986), member of Japanese popular music group Bon-Bon Blanco
 Laura Mako (1916–2019), American interior designer
 Zach Mako (born 1988), American politician 
 Maku people or Mako people, an indigenous people of South America

Organisations
 MAKO Surgical Corp., a medical device company 
 mako (website), an Israeli news and entertainment portal owned by Keshet Media Group

Military
 AgustaWestland AW109 "Mako", the service name for the light utility helicopter of the Royal New Zealand Airforce
 Fighting Makos, the 93rd Fighter Squadron based at Homestead ARB, Florida
 UTAP-22 Mako, a jet UAV, a variant of the

Products
 Diamond Mako, a re-branded version of the Psion Revo PDA
 EADS Mako/HEAT, a jet aircraft
 Lancair Mako, an American kit aircraft
 Mako, a boat brand of White River Marine Group
 Nexus 4 (codenamed "Mako"), a smartphone by Google and LG Electronics

Fiction
 Mako, a magical substance from the Final Fantasy VII metaseries
 Mako Ballistics, a fictional weapons manufacturer in the video game Deus Ex: Invisible War
 Mako, a companion character from Star Wars: The Old Republic
 Mako Spince, a minor character introduced in Star Wars: Dark Empire
 Mako, a villain from the Savage Dragon comic book
 Mako Hooker, the main character from Something's Down There by Mickey Spillane
 M35 Mako, an infantry fighting vehicle in the game Mass Effect
 Mako Island, a fictional island in the television programme H2O: Just Add Water and in:
 Mako: Island of Secrets, a television programme
 Mako Tsunami, in the list of Yu-Gi-Oh! anime and manga characters
 Mako: The Jaws of Death, 1976 film
 Myron Mako, the main protagonist of the 2008 strategy game Robocalypse
 Mako (The Legend of Korra), a major character in The Legend of Korra
 Task Force Mako, an elite American task force in the video game Medal of Honor: Warfighter
 Mako Mori, a major character in the motion picture Pacific Rim
 USS Mako, a fictitious United States Navy Cold War submarine which appears in the 1986 novel To Kill the Potemkin by Mark Joseph
 Mako Mankanshoku, a major character in Kill la Kill
 Mako Rutledge, or Roadhog, a hero in Overwatch (video game)
 Mako Shiraishi, one of the protagonists in the Samurai Sentai Shinkenger
 Mako, a fictional scribe in the Samurai Jack comic series

Other uses
 Mako (dance), an action dance from Tonga
 Mako (SeaWorld Orlando), a roller coaster at SeaWorld Orlando, opened in 2016

See also
 
 
 Maco (disambiguation)
 MAACO
 Mahko, grandfather of Geronimo

Japanese unisex given names